Rowe Farm is a historic home and farm near South Bethlehem, Albany County, New York. The farmhouse was built about 1875, and is a two-story, Italianate frame dwelling with a center hall plan and a gable roof. Also on the property are the contributing Main Barn / Hay Barn (c. 1879), out kitchen (c. 1800), smokehouse (c. 1875), livestock barn (c. 1790), icehouse, shed and outhouse, pig barn, carriage barn (c. 1875), shed, fowl house, and blacksmith shop.

It was listed on the National Register of Historic Places in 2012.

References

Farms on the National Register of Historic Places in New York (state)
Italianate architecture in New York (state)
Houses completed in 1875
Buildings and structures in Albany County, New York
National Register of Historic Places in Albany County, New York
Blacksmith shops